The 1932 Marshall Thundering Herd football team was an American football team that represented Marshall College (now Marshall University) in the West Virginia Athletic Conference during the 1932 college football season. In its second season under head coach Tom Dandelet, the team compiled a 6–2–1 record, 3–0 against conference opponents, and outscored opponents by a total of 155 to 58. Sammy McEwen was the team captain.

Schedule

References

Marshall
Marshall Thundering Herd football seasons
Marshall Thundering Herd football